Caroline Springs Hockey Club is a field hockey club based in Caroline Springs, Victoria, Victoria, Australia. The club was incorporated in November 2016. With initial discussion taking place in the winter of 2016, with David Gorton and Ron Shadbolt meeting with Hockey Victoria CEO - Andrew Skillern, the business plan identified that there was a need to form an organization that gave opportunity for children in the Caroline Springs and the Greater City of Melton to experience an Olympic sport, where little or no awareness is evident. Following discussions with players, supporters and potential sponsors, a feasibility study was prepared, using the data from Melton City Council and Hockey Victoria (HV). With a critical mass of “founding” members, it became clear that there was an appetite for hockey in the region, and so Caroline Springs Hockey Club was born. With a commitment to Junior development and mass participation, the values, vision and mission of the Club will lead to an explosion of interest in the Western growth corridor.

The Men's 1st and 2nd XI  play in the Hockey Victoria Metro competition, and the Women's 1st IX play in Victoria State League, with the reserves also playing in the Hockey Victoria Metro Competition. The club currently fields two men's teams, two women's teams, U10 Boys, U10 Girls and U12 youth development teams. The senior teams train at The Bridge Road Sports Precinct in Melton South, with training starting at 7pm.

Club song

"There’s a big, big sound, From the west of the town, It’s the sound of the mighty Springers

We take the longest strides, We have the hardest hits, We’re stronger than the rest

We’re the CSHC Springers, We’re the biggest and the best

And we will never surrender, We’ll fight until the end, We’re greater than the rest"

Individual honours

 Ron Shadbolt (women's coach)  recognised by Hockey Victoria for his coaching in the community - shortlisted for Community Coach of the Year (2016).
 Aimee Jungfer squad member Hockey Victoria State (U15) Squad (2017).
 Aimee Jungfer and Nolan Cockburn member of the U17 North West Tigers( 2017).
Jakob Cichy 'train on' member of the U17 North West Tigers (2018).

Team Honours

WVL2 Premiers (2018)
WPG Premiers (2017)
MMANW Runner's Up (2018)
WMBNW Premiers (2017,2018)

In the Community

CSHC supports the awareness days championed by Hockey Victoria, including Men's Health Round, Women's & Girls Round and Fair Go Round. In 2018, CSHC hosted the inaugural Beyond Blue Cup, raising over $1000.

Milestones

Jessica Kelly (50 games)
Kathy Jungfer (50 games)
David Gorton (50 games)

Club Person of the Year Award

Rae Shadbolt (2018)
Robert Lake (2017)

References

Australian field hockey clubs
Field hockey clubs established in 2016
Sport in the City of Melton
2016 establishments in Australia
Sporting clubs in Melbourne